Gymnoconia is a genus of rust fungi in the family Phragmidiaceae. G. nitens causes an orange rust of Rubus species.

Gymnoconia interstitialis

Importance
Gymnoconia interstitialis, otherwise known as "orange rust of raspberries", is a well-known disease of raspberries and blackberries throughout the eastern United States and southern Canada. It can stretch as far south as Florida, or as far west as California, and is also quite common in Europe and Asia (the disease cycles of this rust that are found in northern Europe are considered "long", as opposed to some of the "short" cycles found in the southern United States). Short cycles tend to attack cultivated varieties or blackberries, which has led to an economic setback in their production in the United States. This is not an issue in the European varieties, as the short cycle disease is not found in the Old World. Additionally, black raspberries of New York commonly are affected by orange rust, but the region north of Connecticut has been successful in containing the disease to a confined area.

Wild and cultivated raspberries and blackberries are the most common host for Gymnoconia interstitialis. A resistant host has been discovered in Illinois – the Snyder.

The pathogen targets the viability of the leaves, attacking them until they die and fall off of the plant. The disease returns annually, and this recurrence essentially makes the plants worthless – rarely do affected plants recover. Some strains have such a strong impact on the plants that the cultivation becomes unprofitable.

Hosts and symptoms
Signs of the disease appear in the spring. Glandular bodies form on the top side of the leaves, even before they are entirely unfolded. Once fully mature, these bodies appear as black specks with chlorosis (yellowing) around them. To be clear, the glandular bodies seen here would be a sign rather than a symptom, as signs refer to the visible presence of the pathogen, whereas symptoms refer to the effects of the pathogen (the chlorosis previously mentioned would thus be considered a symptom.) Not all leaves or leaflets of the plant will have the specks. Several weeks after the initial appearance of the glandular bodies, a rust will begin to form on the underside of the leaf. The rust is composed of sori, which will eventually break open and release an orange-colored mass of spores – this is where the disease gets the name "orange rust". Typically, this release of spores is quite intense and ends up filling the entire underside of the leaf with the orange spores. The affected leaves dwarf and roll into themselves, rendering them useless.

Disease cycle
Gymnoconia interstitialis is a fungus – specifically a basidiomycete. The mycelium lives from year to year in the infected plant. The mycelium can be found in the roots of the plant between the cells of the cortex (near the cambium). The parenchyma inside of the leaves is the initial source of infection. When infection occurs in a young plant, hyphae may be found in any of the tissues. In the affected organs of the plant, the mycelium develops haustoria, which appear as side branching from the mycelium. The haustoria penetrate through cell walls to extract nutrients, while the fungus follows the growing-tip of the plant. As discussed in the  section, black bodies appear on the upper surface of the leaves during the spring. These black bodies are sterile and are referred to as spermagonia, or pycnia. The orange "cushions" that develop later on the under-side of the leaf are forming spores, which have the capability to germinate all at once. From each spore a short promycelium bearing four sporidia is protruded. During the growing season, these sporidia cause infections on other plants in the raspberry and blackberry families. The sporidia give rise to mycelium, and once winter comes, the fungus is dormant. The disease overwinters as mycelium in the canes, crown and roots of the plants.

References

External links

Pucciniales